

Kielce County is a unit of territorial administration and local government (powiat) in Świętokrzyskie Voivodeship, south-central Poland. It came into being on January 1, 1999, as a result of the Polish local government reforms passed in 1998. Its administrative seat is the city of Kielce, although the city is not part of the county (it constitutes a separate city county).

As of 2019 its total population is 206,856, out of which the population of Chęciny is 4,444, that of Chmielnik is 3,681, that of Daleszyce is 2,896, that of Bodzentyn is 2,233, that of Morawica is 1,711, and the rural population is 191,891.

Neighbouring counties
Apart from the city of Kielce, Kielce County is also bordered by Końskie County to the north, Skarżysko County to the north-east, Starachowice County, Ostrowiec County and Opatów County to the east, Staszów County to the south-east, Busko County and Pińczów County to the south, Jędrzejów County to the south-west, and Włoszczowa County to the west.

Administrative division
The county is subdivided into 19 gminas (four urban-rural and 15 rural). These are listed in the following table, in descending order of population.

References

 
Kielce